Vincent Hermance (born 1 August 1984 in Meaux, France) is a French mountain bike trials cyclist. He specialises in 26-inch trials.

Hermance was UCI junior world champion in 2001 and UCI elite world champion in 2007, 2013, and 2015 in the 26-inch category. Competing with the French team he won the team trials world championship in 2005, 2011, 2015, and 2016. He also has two bronze medals in world championships in the elite 20-inch category.

He is the son of Dominique Hermance, founder of the trials-bike brands Koxx and Hashtagg.

References

French male cyclists
Mountain bike trials riders
UCI Mountain Bike World Champions (men)
Living people
1984 births
21st-century French people